The Susquehanna Trail was an auto trail in the United States linking Washington, D.C. with Niagara Falls, New York. It passed through Baltimore, Maryland; Harrisburg, Pennsylvania; Williamsport, Pennsylvania; and Buffalo, New York.

In relatively modern terms, the Susquehanna Trail roughly followed the following highways:
U.S. Route 1, Washington, D.C., to Baltimore, Maryland
U.S. Route 111 (now MD Route 45, Interstate 83 Business and other minor routes), Baltimore to Harrisburg, Pennsylvania
U.S. Route 22, Harrisburg to Duncannon, Pennsylvania
U.S. Route 11, Duncannon to Northumberland, Pennsylvania
PA Route 147, Northumberland to Muncy, Pennsylvania
U.S. Route 220, Muncy to Williamsport, Pennsylvania
U.S. Route 15, Williamsport to Wayland, New York
NY Route 63, Wayland to Dansville, New York
NY Route 36, Dansville to Leicester, New York
U.S. Route 20A, Leicester to East Aurora, New York
NY Route 16, East Aurora to Buffalo, New York
NY Route 5 and U.S. Route 62, Buffalo to Niagara Falls, New York

An alternate ran from Washington to Harrisburg via U.S. Route 240 and U.S. Route 15 through Frederick, Maryland.

References
The Susquehanna Trail (post-1926)

Auto trails in the United States
Roads in Maryland
Transportation in Pennsylvania
Transportation in New York (state)
U.S. Route 1
U.S. Route 22
U.S. Route 11
U.S. Route 15
U.S. Route 20
U.S. Route 62